L.A.B. is the debut studio album by New Zealand band L.A.B., released in November 2017. The album become a sleeper hit, becoming one of the top performing albums in New Zealand between 2019 and 2022.

Production

L.A.B. originally formed as a project for Kora members Brad and Stu Kora, in collaboration with Ara Adams-Tamatea of Katchafire and vocalist Joel Shadbolt. The songs recorded on the album were written and performed between 2015 and 2017, and developed based on audience reception.

The album was written in Whakatāne and Tauranga, and recorded in Wellington at Dr Lee Prebble's home recording studio, Surgery Studios.

Release and promotion

Four tracks were released as singles in the lead-up to the album's release. "Jimmy Boy" was the first, released on 21 September 2017 on the date when the album was announced. This was followed by "Starry Eyes" followed on 12 October, "Ain't No Use" on 2 November and "Umulash" on the 16th.

A music video was released for the album's final single "Controller", on 31 July 2018. The song became a hit in 2020 after the release of the band's single "In the Air", becoming the 8th most successful single by a New Zealand artist in 2020.

Track listing

Credits and personnel

A. Adams-Tamatea – arrangement (9), backing vocals (8), bass (1–3, 5, 7–8, 11–12), bass moog voyager (9–10), moog bass (2, 4), songwriting (9)
B. Kora – arrangement (4, 7, 9, 11–12), backing vocals (1, 4, 6, 8), chorus vocals (9–10), drums (1–12), lyrics (1, 4–10, 12), percussion (2, 5, 8–10), producer, sampling (6–7, 9–10), songwriting (1–3, 5, 7, 9, 11–12), string & percussion arrangement (2), string arrangment (4, 11), timpani (3)
S. Kora – acoustic guitar (12), B3 organ (8–10), backing vocals (1, 4, 6, 8), guitar (3), keys (1, 3–4, 8–11), organ (6, 11), rhythm guitar (5), songwriting (9, 11–12), synth (2, 4, 6–10)
T. Kora – songwriting (11), slide guitar (11)
L.A.B. – arrangement (1–3, 5–6, 8, 10), chants (3), lyrics (3), songwriting (4, 6, 8, 10)
Dr Lee Prebble – co-producer, sound engineer
J. Shadbolt – acoustic guitar (5, 12), backing vocals (6), guitar (1, 3–4, 6, 8, 10), lyrics (2, 4–6, 8, 10), songwriting (2, 12), vocals (1–12)
Leisure Tomlins – vocals (4)

Charts

Weekly charts

Year-end charts

Certifications

Release history

References

2017 debut albums
L.A.B. albums